Ursula of Munsterberg (c. 1491/95 or 1499, presumably in Teschen - after 2 February 1534, presumably in Stift Gernrode or Liegnitz) was a German nun and writer, known for her role during the reformation.

Life
She was a daughter of Victor, Duke of Münsterberg, and a granddaughter of George of Poděbrady, king of Bohemia. She came from the Crownlands of the Bohemian Kingdom, which is now the Czech Republic. 

She became a nun in the Order of St Mary Magdalene. She famously left the convent during the reformation. She became a known Protestant writer.

References

Czech nobility
16th-century women writers
Lutheran writers
1490s births
16th-century deaths
Converts to Lutheranism from Roman Catholicism
16th-century German Roman Catholic nuns
Podiebrad family
16th-century Bohemian women
16th-century Bohemian writers
16th-century German writers
16th-century German women writers
People of the Protestant Reformation